is a Japanese episodic horror adventure game first released on 28 August 2017. The game was developed by Nankidai, a manga artist, and was later adapted into a manga and light novel, which were both released in 2021. An English translation was released in 2019. A Steam release was released on February 20, 2023 in Early Access with the vgperson translation used for the English version.

Gameplay 
Your Turn to Die is an adventure game with conversations laid out in a manner akin to a visual novel. The game uses a first-person view. Characters in view can be interacted with directly by clicking on them. Players interact with the onscreen menu to move between areas, save their game, and use items, similar to a point-and-click adventure game. Unlike many RPG Maker games, there is no level progression or character stats. However, there are puzzles which require careful item usage to solve, and minigames that test the player's reaction time. "Discussions" in which the player must deduce the correct logical solution in order to advance time contribute to a large part of the game. During discussion time, focusing on an incorrect or irrelevant statement will cause the main character's "clout" to drop; reducing it to zero causes a Game Over. Certain decisions made during discussions change the game's plot significantly, though most decisions only give different dialogue options. Other gameplay features include Partner Abilities, usable when traveling with certain characters, and Debates, in which the player must find the incorrect statement within a group of four.

Plot 
High-school student Sara Chidouin is walking home from school when she and her friend, Joe Tazuna, are kidnapped and sent to a mysterious facility. They are then trapped in the facility and forced to compete in a "Death Game" in which characters decide who dies by taking majority votes. With few other options, Sara and Joe must follow the commands of their kidnappers and cooperate with the 9 other characters present. Each chapter takes place on a different floor of the facility. In the first chapter, the game is explained in basic terms. Thinking it was simply a test, most people vote for themselves, with 3 voting for the oldest character in the group, Kazumi Mishima. He is executed and decapitated as a result of their votes.

After recovering from the shock of his death and finding one more participant, Gonbee Yamada, the characters are forced to participate in the Main Game. The Main Game is a card game functioning in a similar way to Mafia— the characters are each given roles which may give them advantages during the game. The party must choose, via majority vote, one person to die. The roles include one Keymaster, Sage, and Sacrifice. Everyone else is a Commoner. If the Keymaster is chosen, everyone will die. The Sage has knowledge on who the Keymaster is. The Sacrifice will die unless voted for, in which case everyone except the Sacrifice and one other person will die. The Commoner has no power. As such, it is rigged so that at least two of them will die. During the game, they find out that Gonbee's real name is Alice Yabusame, older brother to Reko Yabusame, and was previously in jail for murder. Joe is stuck with the Sacrifice card, which sealed his fate. The party chooses to vote for Kai Satou, the apprentice homemaker, after finding out he was in contact with the kidnappers, and revealed to be the Sage. They later find out via his laptop that he plotted to rebel against them.

The group of nine advance to the third floor of the facility, where many minigames await them, giving tokens that can be used to purchase rewards and extra content not visible otherwise. Sara begins to have hallucinations of Joe that make her feel responsible for his death. Three more antagonists are introduced. One of them explains that the organization responsible for the kidnappings produces lifelike dolls, some of which share appearances of the game's participants. They also have AIs of the main characters, which Sara can talk to. The final minigame involves Sara and two of the female participants, Nao Egokoro and Reko, trying to save Q-taro Burgerberg and Gin Ibushi. While solving the minigame's puzzle, the group realizes that earlier on, the musician Reko was replaced with an impostor created using a doll body and AI made by the kidnappers. In order to save the lives of both Gin and Q-taro, Sara must decide whether she will sacrifice the doll or let her live. This decision significantly affects the game's plot; if Sara chooses to kill the fake Reko, Reko's brother Alice is killed. If she chooses not to kill the fake Reko, the doll finds the real Reko and kills her, meeting her own demise in the process.

After a number of investigations and a concentrated effort to escape on behalf of the remaining participants in the death game, they are forced to play the Main Game once again. Art student Nao Egokoro received the Sacrifice card in this round, and her execution plays out at the end unless the player votes for her. However, voting for Nao results in an early ending.

With Keiji Shinogi being revealed the Keymaster, the only two safe options to vote for are job-hopper Sou Hiyori or middle-school student Kanna Kizuchi. Kanna asks the party to vote for her, arguing Sou's computer experience would be more helpful in escaping. Sou, in turn, begs the party to vote for him after revealing that he's been proven to have a 0.0% survival rate in various simulations of the Main Game. As the party enters deadlock, it falls on Sara to break the tie. If Sara votes for Sou, Sou admits he knew his death was destined to happen and attempts to flee. He is attacked by the facility's defense system, and dies slowly from his wounds. In his last moments, he boots up a Joe AI in a computer on the third floor, which Sara interacts with and cures her of her hallucinations of Joe. If Sara instead chooses to vote for Kanna, she humbly thanks Sara for choosing her, much to Sou's dismay, and asks the party not to give up on Sou, claiming he is a good person deep down. She is given a near-painless death as vines and flowers sprout from her body. Sou becomes enraged by this choice, and starts up a malicious version of the Joe AI, causing Sara's memories of Joe to become so traumatic that she represses them completely and forgets who Joe is.

Upon advancing to the next floor, Sara and the five remaining survivors play a new game hosted by a doll named Midori by default (though the player can rename him). Their objective is to find and kill Midori by tagging him. However, anyone who gets tagged by him will be executed. The survivors are also paired up with six dolls called the "Dummies": doll copies of participants who died in their first trials before meeting any other participants of the death game. On the fourth and fifth floors, the party solve puzzles, fight monsters, and search for Midori. Sara helps the survivors recover lost memories of them meeting Midori in the past. The doll Mai Tsurugi stabs Q-taro in the back under the impression that she had to kill him in order to survive. The tag game ends when Midori tags Keiji and traps him in a coffin that is set to burn him alive after the timer runs out. Sara's choice between Sou and Kanna in Chapter 2 has major ramifications during this chapter. If Kanna survived, Sara reaffirms her dedication to leave with everyone alive and totally dismisses doll Ranmaru Kageyama's consideration of leaving together by killing the entire party (as two people cannot reach majority vote, nullifying the Main Game). If Sou survived, Sara will very briefly entertain Ranmaru's idea, which gives him confidence to put it into motion. This will result in Ranmaru killing either Reko or Alice, depending on who survived in the previous chapter. Eventually, the party learns that to clear the floor, they must take part in the "banquet" in which in order to win, Sara and the remaining humans must find the coffin Midori is stored in and kill him, while Midori must locate and kill Gin Ibushi who was voluntarily placed in a coffin himself. As Midori becomes more and more desperate to save himself, he accuses Keiji, who reveals himself to have escaped the burning coffin in the final stage of the banquet, of cheating by using the late Professor Mishima's collar on a coffin to give the impression a human was inside. With his coffin finally located, he offers Sara to forgive Keiji's cheating and subsequent execution if she picks her party member, Gin's coffin instead. Sara rejects this compromise and Midori perishes. Afterwards, it's revealed Keiji in fact did not cheat and Q-Taro, knowing his death was coming, had sneaked into the coffin Keiji was in and burned alive before the banquet started.

The story is under development as of February 2023, currently going up to Chapter 3, Part 1-B.

Development
Nankidai has hosted various livestreams on Niconico in which he discusses the game's development.

Release 
Your Turn To Die is released episodically in the form of chapters split into multiple parts. The first part of the first chapter was released on August 28, 2017, followed by the release of the second and final part of the first chapter on January 31, 2018. The second chapter was similarly split between two releases, the first having been released on August 7, 2018, and the second being released on May 21, 2019. Chapter 3 of Your Turn To Die was further divided into Part 1-A and Part 1-B, with the former being released on February 25, 2020, and the latter being released one year later on May 30, 2021. On August 28, 2022, a Steam release has been announced and was released on February 20, 2023 as Early Access, up to Chapter 3 Part 1-B. The Steam release contains DLC of the artbook with additional pages and a mini episode for each character. The final chapter will be released on Steam first, then the free version later.

Media

Manga
A manga adapting the events in the game was published in Monthly Shōnen Ace on 26 March 2019. It was drawn by Tatsuya Ikegami. An English translation for the first volume was published by Yen Press, with translation by Jason Moses and lettering by Phil Christie. As of February 2022, there are three volumes available.
A spin-off manga named Kimi yon ~dare mo shinanai kimigashine~ was released on 26 February 2021. It features 4-koma comics illustrated by Nankidai and Yusuke Higeoni, in an alternate universe where no one in the story dies.

Novel
A light novel written by Teshigahara Anemo and published by KADOKAWA was released on 27 February 2021. Production of the novel was overseen by Nankidai. The novel retells the events of the game from Joe's perspective.

Reception

Game
The game has over 4,130,000 plays as of January 2022.

Timothy Wu of Keengamer described the game as a "superb visual novel" with an "extremely strong cast of characters".

Manga
A review by Demelza from Anime UK News described the manga as "generic" and critiqued its character writing, giving it a 5/10.

Two reviews from writers at RightStufAnime had conflicting viewpoints of the manga. Devlen enjoyed the art and found the concept "interesting", but was ultimately unsatisfied by the lack of stakes in the first volume. The second reviewer, Chris S. found the manga "underwhelming", stating that he had seen the concept done before in a better fashion.

A review from Asian Movie Pulse calls the manga "a serviceable entry in the death game genre." The writer points out that the manga has a lot of potential, which has not quite been reached yet due to the manga being unfinished. He praises the art, stating that "Ikegami takes inspiration from the game while bringing his own sense of identity through his art".

Merchandise
Your Turn To Die has a merchandise line licensed by Dwango. The line includes keychains, two music albums with the game's entire OST, and an artbook which was available for a limited time. 
The website "gJ character G" has a line of Your Turn To Die themed pillows, rings, necklaces, and clothing items based on the characters.

References

External links 
 Official Website
 RPG Atsumaru Website
 English Translation Website
 

2017 video games
Doujin video games
Indie video games
Japan-exclusive video games
RPG Maker games
Freeware games
Video games featuring female protagonists
Windows games
Windows-only games
Single-player video games
Video games developed in Japan
Video games set in Japan
Horror video games
Browser games
Psychological horror games
Video games about death games
Video games adapted into comics
Video games adapted into novels
Episodic video games
Fiction about death games